Armudaq (also Romanized as Ārmūdāq) is a village in Garmeh-ye Shomali Rural District of Kandovan District, Mianeh County, East Azerbaijan province, Iran. At the 2006 National Census, its population was 943 in 204 households. The following census in 2011 counted 711 people in 197 households. The latest census in 2016 showed a population of 603 people in 185 households; it was the largest village in its rural district.

References 

Meyaneh County

Populated places in East Azerbaijan Province

Populated places in Meyaneh County